James Humes may refer to:
James C. Humes (born 1934), co-author of the text on the Apollo 11 lunar plaque
Jim Humes, American judge
Jimmy Humes (born 1942), English professional footballer

See also
James Hume (disambiguation)